In the Streets to Africa is the fourth studio album (third released with VP Records) by Jamaican singer Richie Spice. This album featured the number 54 charting song Youths Dem Cold which was also featured on the Grand Theft Auto IV soundtrack. The album features vocals from Joseph Hill of the Roots reggae group Culture, Richie's brothers Spanner Banner & Pliers.

Track listing

All track written by B. Bonner unless otherwise stated

Reception
AllMusic gave the album 3 stars out of 5, and its review states that "Richie is undeniably a master of a certain variety of modern roots reggae", "listeners can probably all agree that praising a woman for her domestic skills is better than bragging about how many people he's shot", "Highlights include the brilliant sufferer's anthem "Youth Dem Cold," a very fine duo performance that features Joseph Hill (of Culture), and the sweet and simple "Take It Easy"." Whilst also saying "at times the Rastafarian version of social consciousness can sound an awful lot like retrograde conservatism to Babylonian ears" and "Less inspiring are the strangely desultory "Get Up," which opens the album, and the generic nyahbinghi repatriation anthem that ends it".

However, the BBC gave a more positive review saying "This year's In The Streets To Africa has remedied all that, maintaining an unerring level of quality control and flowing end to end despite being a hefty 15 tracks long", "Like the best Jamaican singers, Spice's success comes down to being equally at ease with both religious or pan-African themes and romantic relaxation" and "the consistency of this album makes for one glorious, uninterrupted listen."

Charts
Billboard Top Reggae Albums – #6

References

External links
 Review at BBC music 

2007 albums